The title The Unknown War may refer to:

The Unknown War (book), a 1995 military history book written by Hienadz Sahanovich
The Unknown War (documentary), a 1978 US documentary hosted by Burt Lancaster